Mission Street is a north-south arterial thoroughfare in Daly City and San Francisco, California that runs from Daly City's southern border to San Francisco's northeast waterfront. The street and San Francisco's Mission District through which it runs were named for the Spanish Mission Dolores, several blocks away from the modern route. Only the southern half is historically part of El Camino Real, which connected the missions. Part of Mission Street in Daly City is signed as part of State Route 82 (SR 82).

Alignment

From the south, Mission Street begins as a continuation of SR 82/El Camino Real at the Colma-Daly City border, just south of San Pedro Road. Mission Street then runs north to the Top of the Hill district, where SR 82 splits as San Jose Avenue to the northeast, and Mission Street continues north-northeast. It then crosses the San Francisco city limits mid-block between Templeton Avenue in Daly City and Huron Avenue in San Francisco. Mission Street then turns back northeast through the working-class Crocker-Amazon, Excelsior, and Bernal Heights neighborhoods, before turning north through the colorful Outer Mission and Inner Mission districts.  Near Van Ness Avenue, the road turns northeast again and travels through Mid-Market and South of Market (running parallel to, and a full block south of Market Street) before ending at The Embarcadero in downtown San Francisco.

History

The Mission alignment was selected because Market had a high ridge between Second and Fifth; although a cut was still required for Mission, it was less extensive. A parallel plank road was completed along Folsom Street to stave off potential competition from a free road along Market; however, a high tide in 1854 destroyed the Folsom Plank Road by floating off the planks.

Since 2000, between Third Street and Beale Street in the Financial District, several new high rises have been erected along Mission Street, all in the vicinity of the San Francisco Transbay development project: 101 Second Street (2000), JPMorgan Chase Building (2002), The Paramount (2002), St. Regis Museum Tower (2005), 555 Mission Street (2008), Millennium Tower (2009), 535 Mission Street (2014), 350 Mission Street (2015), and the Salesforce Tower (2017).

Transportation
The Mission Street portion in San Francisco is served 24 hours per day by the San Francisco Municipal Railway 14 Mission trolleybus, two BART stations that run below grade in the Inner Mission, and the remainder of the San Francisco BART stations less than a half mile away, notably including those on the Market Street Subway. The street is four lanes wide.

The Transbay Transit Center, which replaced the Transbay Terminal, straddles several blocks between Mission and Howard. It is the western terminus for several AC Transit bus lines via the San Francisco–Oakland Bay Bridge, and it will be the future northern terminus of Caltrain and the California High-Speed Rail Authority. From the completion of the Bay Bridge in 1936 until the 1950s, it was also the western terminus for Key System commuter rail service.

Major intersections

References

External links

Streets in San Francisco
Mission District, San Francisco
Streets in San Mateo County, California